Carlton Earl "Carl" Anderson (February 27, 1945 – February 23, 2004) was an American singer, film and theater actor best known for his portrayal of Judas Iscariot in the Broadway and film versions of the rock opera Jesus Christ Superstar by Andrew Lloyd Webber and Tim Rice. Anderson and singer-actress Gloria Loring performed the duet "Friends and Lovers", which reached No. 2 on the Billboard Hot 100 chart in 1986.

Life and career

Early life
Born in Lynchburg, Virginia, Anderson was one of 12 children of James and Alberta Anderson. During his junior year of high school, Anderson enlisted in the U.S. Air Force, where he served as a communications technician for two years. He returned to Lynchburg to complete high school and he graduated in 1965. With his honorable discharge, following high school, Anderson sang at military bases across the United States as part of the World Wide Air Force Talent Contest.

Anderson moved to Washington, D.C., in 1969, where he and some friends formed a group called "The Second Eagle", with Anderson handling the vocals. Among the many jazz and rock tunes that the Second Eagle covered were some from the album Jesus Christ Superstar, which had been released long before there were ever any definitive plans for a stage production.

In 1971, a talent agent from the William Morris Agency saw Anderson perform some songs from the show at St. Stephen's Church and recognized his potential as a solo performer.

Early career
Anderson played the role of Judas in the pre-Broadway touring company's production of Jesus Christ Superstar but was passed over for the initial 1971 Broadway production when producers opted for the more well-known Ben Vereen for the part, and was cast as an understudy. One of his most significant opportunities came when he took over the role from Vereen and performed it on Broadway and in Los Angeles when Vereen fell ill. After Vereen recovered, both actors took turns playing the role. Castmate and close friend Ted Neeley was performing in the tour as well, but – like Anderson – was cast as chorus and the Jesus understudy. Yvonne Elliman was also in the tour as Mary Magdalene. While performing in Los Angeles, Anderson was flown to London for a screen test for the film adaptation of the rock opera. Two weeks later, he left that production to begin filming in Israel alongside Neeley and Elliman, who were cast for the main roles as Jesus and Magdalene, respectively. The film, released in 1973 by director Norman Jewison, catapulted Anderson's career with two Golden Globe nominations as "Most Promising Newcomer" and "Best Musical Actor".

In the late 1970s, he reprised his performance as Judas for two regional productions in California, both under the auspices of the California Youth Theatre organization. The first reunited him with his Broadway and film co-stars Ted Neeley and Yvonne Elliman, and the second reunited him again with his close friend Ted.

Other movie appearances by Anderson include: The Black Pearl (1978) and Steven Spielberg's The Color Purple (1985). Television appearances include The Eddie Capra Mysteries, Cop Rock, Days of Our Lives, and Hill Street Blues.

As a recording artist, Anderson was equally prolific. He signed with Motown Records in 1972. Several of the most recognizable albums to be released in the 1970s would bear the mark of Anderson, including his work with Stevie Wonder on his Songs in the Key of Life double album.

Anderson also made numerous appearances at several notable clubs in Los Angeles during the 1970s and, with Columbia Records' talent scout Larkin Arnold, signed a record deal for which Anderson would release four albums on the Epic label beginning in 1983. In total, Anderson released nine jazz and Soul albums as a solo artist, including hits "How Deep Does It Go", "Pieces of a Heart", "Hot Coffee", and the hit from his self-titled 1986 album, "Friends and Lovers", a duet with Gloria Loring. The song reached the number-two spot on the charts that year and endeared Anderson to soap opera fans, after he and Loring performed the song on Days of Our Lives. In 1989, Anderson recorded the song "Between You and Me", which was used as the title theme for the film Her Alibi. He also recorded on albums with other leading artists.

Later career
In 1994, Anderson released an album titled Heavy Weather Sunlight Again which is full of soulful songs such as "Love'll Hold My Baby Tonight".
In 1992, Anderson reprised his role as Judas in Jesus Christ Superstar for a "20th Anniversary of the Movie" tour, alongside Ted Neeley who also reprised his role as Jesus. Both men had agreed to do the tour only if they got to work together. Initially planned for three months, the production lasted five years and grossed over $100 million, visiting over 50 North American cities, including the Paramount Theater at Madison Square Garden in New York City, the Universal Amphitheater in Los Angeles, the Fox Theaters in Detroit, St. Louis and Atlanta, the Morris Mechanic Theatre in Baltimore, The Orpheum in San Francisco, Providence Performing Arts Center in Providence, Rhode Island, the Wang Center and Shubert Theater during multiple returns to Boston as well as dates in Washington, D.C., Philadelphia, Miami, Toronto, Vancouver and Montreal. All these showings allowed Anderson to reprise his role over 1,700 times.

In 1997, Anderson performed on Broadway in an adaptation of William Shakespeare's Twelfth Night called Play On! featuring the music of Duke Ellington, playing The Duke. Beginning in 1998, and in later years of his life, he reprised his role as Judas in Superstar to sold-out auditoriums around the world.

One of his later albums, Why We Are Here!, was recorded at the Agape International Spiritual Center, then located in Santa Monica, California. He continued to perform, with Linda Eder, in a show called Once in a Lifetime produced by Eder's then-husband, Frank Wildhorn.

In 2002, Anderson reprised his role as Judas in another national tour of Jesus Christ Superstar with ex-Skid Row singer Sebastian Bach playing Jesus. Bach received mixed reviews while Anderson was again praised. In April 2003, following a disagreement with the director, Bach walked out on the tour and was replaced with Broadway actor Eric Kunze.  Anderson stayed on the tour for three more months, but eventually left the show after being diagnosed with leukemia. The tour closed a year after his death.

Personal life and death
In 1992, Anderson married Veronica Porché, former wife of boxing legend Muhammad Ali.

Anderson was diagnosed with leukemia in 2003 while performing with the national tour of Superstar that had started in 2002. According to a page on Anderson's memorial website, he had a minor car accident on his way to perform and, while being treated for his injuries, doctors discovered that Anderson had leukemia. Anderson died from the illness on February 23, 2004, in Los Angeles, just four days before his 59th birthday. The Leonard Cohen / Anjani song "Nightingale" from 2004 was recorded in his memory.

Discography

Solo

Soundtracks and compilations
— indicates a solo contribution.

Other artists

Theater and concert credits

Filmography

References

External links
 The Official Website of Performing Artist Carl Anderson
 Carl Anderson Biography at SoulTracks
 
 

1945 births
2004 deaths
African-American male actors
American tenors
American male musical theatre actors
Deaths from leukemia
Musicians from Lynchburg, Virginia
Male actors from Virginia
Singers from Virginia
Deaths from cancer in California
GRP Records artists
United States Air Force airmen